"Comment ça va" (French for "How is it going?") is a 1983 pop song by Dutch boy band The Shorts.

The song deals about a boy who meets a French girl, but they can not understand each other because they speak different languages.

It was originally written in English by Dutch composer Eddy de Heer, but EMI insisted on a Dutch version which was written by Jack Jersey who also produced this song. The Dutch version was released as a single, but was neglected by the official Dutch radio stations. After 10,000 singles were sold, with only airplay on pirate radio, the official radio stations started playing the song and it went to the number one spot in the Dutch Top 40. It quickly became an international hit, selling about 4 million singles, with versions in English, German, French and Spanish.

Ingela "Pling" Forsman wrote lyrics in Swedish, also named "Comment ça va", which was recorded by Kikki Danielsson and released on the album Singles Bar in 1983, and as a single with "Du skriver dina kärlekssånger" as B-side. With her recording, Kikki Danielsson scored a hit in the Nordic region in mid 1983, peaking at #3 on the Norwegian singles chart.
Norwegian singer Bente Lind also recorded a Norwegian version of the song in 1983.

It was first performed in Hungary in the mid 1980s by the Fáraó Band (in Hungarian, only keeping in French the refrain: Comment ça va; Comme ci, comme ci, comme ça), then, after its high popularity, by other artists, for example György Korda and Klári Balázs.

Chart performance

The Shorts

Kikki Danielsson

Sales and certifications

See also
List of Dutch Top 40 number-one singles of 1983

References

1983 singles
Dutch pop songs
Dutch-language songs
Macaronic songs
Dutch Top 40 number-one singles
Kikki Danielsson songs
1983 songs
Songs about Paris
EMI Records singles